Tunji Femi Awojobi (born July 30, 1973) is a retired Nigerian professional basketball player. A former boxer, Awojobi graduated from Boston University in 1997. Following graduation, he played in several European countries, most notably in Israel. Awojobi was also a member of the Nigerian national team, and participated in the 1998 and 2006 FIBA World Championship. His best achievement in European basketball was winning the ULEB Cup as the starting center for Hapoel Jerusalem from Israel. In the finals, Jerusalem beat Real Madrid 83:72.

College career
Awojobi played college basketball at Boston University (BU) for four years (1993–1997). He is the first player in New England college basketball history to record 2,000 points and 1,000 rebounds. Awojobi concluded his outstanding career as just one of five Division I players to register career totals of 2,000 points, 1,000 rebounds, and 300 blocked shots. He joined a select group composed of Alonzo Mourning (Georgetown), Pervis Ellison (Louisville), Derrick Coleman (Syracuse), and David Robinson (Navy). Awojobi established 13 BU records, including points (2,308), rebounds (1,237), blocked shots (302), and field goals (871). His rebounding and scoring totals also rank among the best in the history of the America East. In 1996–97, Awojobi led BU to a school-record 25 victories and America East regular-season and tournament titles, and to the NCAA tournament. In recognition of his efforts, Awojobi was a four-time team MVP and first-team all-conference selection. In his senior year, he was named the league's Player of the Year as well as the MVP of the conference's tournament, while adding New England Division I Player of the Year and first-team All-ECAC honors. He was inducted into the BU Hall of Fame in 2002.

See also
 List of NCAA Division I men's basketball players with 2000 points and 1000 rebounds

External links
 Hall of Fame - Tunji Awojobi
 Tunji Awojobi at tblstat.net
 Tunji Awojobi at euroleague.net
 Tunji Awojobi at adriaticbasket.com

1973 births
Living people
Andrea Costa Imola players
BC Avtodor Saratov players
Boston University Terriers men's basketball players
Nigerian expatriate basketball people in Croatia
Hapoel Gilboa/Afula players
Hapoel Jerusalem B.C. players
Ironi Ramat Gan players
KK Cibona players
KK Crvena zvezda players
KK Olimpija players
Maccabi Givat Shmuel players
Nigerian expatriate basketball people in Serbia
Nigerian expatriate basketball people in the United States
Nigerian male boxers
Nigerian men's basketball players
Power forwards (basketball)
Spirou Charleroi players
Sportspeople from Lagos
Yoruba sportspeople
1998 FIBA World Championship players
2006 FIBA World Championship players
Nigerian expatriate basketball people in France
Nigerian expatriate basketball people in Slovenia
Nigerian expatriate basketball people in Israel
Nigerian expatriate basketball people in Belgium
Nigerian expatriate basketball people in Italy